Howard H. Scott was a sound engineer and producer. He is credited with helping to develop the LP as part of a team at CBS Laboratories headed by Peter Goldmark. He also won a Grammy Award for Classical Album of the Year for producing Ives' Symphony No. 1 in collaboration with conductor Morton Gould. He died on September 22, 2012 in Reading, PA, at the age of 92.

References

External links 

 New York Times
 Grammy.com

American audio engineers
2012 deaths